Robert Leighton is a British film and television editor with more than 30 feature film credits since 1980. He has edited nearly all of the films by film director Rob Reiner, commencing with This Is Spinal Tap in 1984. He has also edited three films with Christopher Guest. His work includes hit comedies and mockumentaries such as This Is Spinal Tap, Best in Show and When Harry Met Sally... as well as classic dramas such as Stand by Me and the Stephen King thriller, Misery, which garnered actress Kathy Bates a "Best Actress" Oscar. He was nominated for the Academy Award for Best Film Editing for the feature film, A Few Good Men (1992).

Leighton is an alumnus of London Film School.

Filmography
Leighton's filmography is based on the listing at the Internet Movie Database. The director for each film is indicated in parenthesis.
 A Dog's Purpose (Hallström-2017)
 The Intern (Meyers-2015)
 Chef (Favreau-2014)
 Now You See Me (Leterrier-2013)
 People Like Us (Kurtzman-2012)
 The Details (Estes-2011) (Consulting Editor, with Sarah Boyd)
 Flipped (Reiner-2010)
 Gone with the Pope (Mitchell-2010). Filming was completed in 1976, and Leighton and Robert Florio did some editing. The film was left unfinished at Mitchell's death in 1981. Bob Murawski acquired the film in the 1990s. Over the next fifteen years, he edited it with Jody Fedele and Paul Hart; the film was finally released in 2010.
 The Bucket List (Reiner-2007)
 For Your Consideration (Guest-2006)
 Rumor Has It (Reiner-2005)
 Shall We Dance? (Chelsom-2004)
 A Mighty Wind (Guest-2003)
 Alex & Emma (Reiner-2003)
 Best in Show (Guest-2000). Christopher Guest had starred in This is Spinal Tap, which Leighton edited. The films that Guest has directed are also "mockumentaries", and involve extensive improvisation during filming and extending editing to develop the story.
 The Story of Us (Reiner-1999)
 Hush (Darby-1998)
 Ghosts of Mississippi (Reiner-1996)
 Courage Under Fire (Zwick-1996) (Additional Editor, with Steven Rosenblum)
 The American President (Reiner-1995)
 North (Reiner-1994)
 Life with Mikey (Lapine-1993)
 A Few Good Men (Reiner-1992)
 Late for Dinner (Richter-1991)
 Misery (Reiner-1990). Leighton's editing of the film has been used as a textbook example of "time expansion".
 Blaze (Shelton-1989)
 When Harry Met Sally... (Reiner-1989)
 Bull Durham (Shelton-1988)
 The Princess Bride (Reiner-1987)
 Stand by Me (Reiner-1986)
 The Sure Thing (Reiner-1985)
 This is Spinal Tap (Reiner-1984) (Supervising Editor; Kent Beyda and Kim Secrist are credited as the editors.)
 Wavelength (Gray-1983)
 Blood Tide (Jefferies-1982) (Supervising Editor)
 Kill and Kill Again (Hall-1981)
 Delusion (Beattie-1981) (Also known as The House Where Death Lives)
 Stunt Rock (Trenchard-Smith-1979) (credited as Robert H. Money)
 Fantastic Animation Festival (Berko/Padilla-1977) (Trailer Editor)
 Mastermind (March-1969)

Awards and nominations
This list is based on the Internet Movie Database.
2001 -  Best in Show  - (Nominated) - ACE Eddie Award - Best Editing - Feature Film - Comedy or Musical
1993 - A Few Good Men  - (Nominated) - Academy of Motion Picture Arts and Sciences ("Oscar") - Best Film Editing
1993 - A Few Good Men  - (Nominated) - ACE Eddie Award - Best Film Editing

See also
List of film director and editor collaborations

References

British film editors
Living people
Year of birth missing (living people)
British expatriates in the United States
British television editors
Alumni of the London Film School